William Stover Wells (May 29, 1848 – June 6, 1916) was an American politician who served one term in the Maine House of Representatives. A member of the Republican Party, he represented the towns of Berwick and Wells in York County. He was educated at the Maine State Seminary, which later became Bates College.

References

External links
 

Republican Party members of the Maine House of Representatives
1848 births
1916 deaths
Bates College alumni
19th-century American politicians
People from Wells, Maine